The 2023 Mississippi State Bulldogs baseball team represents Mississippi State University in the 2023 NCAA Division I baseball season. The Bulldogs play their home games at Dudy Noble Field.

Previous season

In 2022, the Bulldogs finished 26–30, 9–21 in the SEC to finish in last place in the West.

Coaching staff

Schedule and results

Record vs. conference opponents

Rankings

See also
2022 Mississippi State Bulldogs softball team

References

Mississippi State
Mississippi State Bulldogs baseball seasons
Mississippi State Bulldogs baseball